= Bồ Đề Pagoda =

The chùa Bồ Đề or Bồ Đề pagoda is a Vietnamese Buddhist temple in Hanoi, Vietnam.
